Cuypers is a variation of the Dutch surname Kuipers and, has the same meaning as the English surname Cooper or Coopers. People with this surname include:

 Alain Cuypers (born 1967), Belgian hurdler
 Brigitte Cuypers (born 1955),  South African tennis player.
 Eduard Cuypers (1859–1927), Dutch architect, nephew of Pierre Cuypers
 Elisabeth Cuypers, Belgian chess master
 Harald Cuypers (born ca. 1940), German slalom canoeist 
 Joseph Cuypers (1861–1949), Dutch architect, son of Pierre Cuypers
  (1871–1952), Belgian-Dutch stage and film actress
  (1947–2017), Dutch jazz composer and pianist
 Marcel Cuypers (1880–?), Belgian fencer
 Pierre Cuypers (1827–1921), Dutch architect, father of Jos Cuypers

Dutch-language surnames
Occupational surnames